Yassine el Hanoudi (born 7 October 1992) is a Moroccan professional footballer who plays as a midfielder for Dutch Derde Divisie club VVOG.

Club career

Morocco 
Born in Rabat, El Hanoudi started playing football at a young age. At the age of fourteen he started at the football academy of the renowned Moroccan football club Association Sportive des Forces Armées Royales (ASFAR). He became known for his defending skills and at sixteen, he joined the youth team of ASFAR with whom he won the championship of 2009. At age seventeen, he left ASFAR to join forces with another football club, Fath Union Sport Rabat (FUS Rabat) where he played next to Badr Boulahroud, Alaedine Ajaray and Adam Ennafati.

Years abroad 
After FUS Rabat, El Hanoudi played for AS Salé, Union Taroudant and Raja Agadir before his international career began at Danish 1st Division club FC Roskilde. El Hanoudi then had a mid-season transfer to Spanish football club Cádiz CF. A year later, France called. El Hanoudi went to French football club Le Mée (Ligue Paris Ile de France N2). in Le Mée-sur-Seine. A successful move, since Le Mée won the championship that season.

El Hanoudi played multiple seasons at Le Mée as a right defender before he transferred to Magreb '90 (later SVA Papendorp) in Utrecht, Netherlands. El Hanoudi was praised for his performances, but due to issues at the club (in February 2020 the executive board of the Royal Dutch Football Association (KNVB) canceled the membership of SVA Papendorp in competition), El Hanoudi left the club after one and a half season. In 2019, El Hanoudi signed with LRC Leerdam. Recently El Hanoudi signed with VVOG, a football club that plays in the Derde Divisie.

References 

1992 births
Living people
AS FAR (football) players
Moroccan footballers
Association football midfielders
Fath Union Sport players
FC Roskilde players
Cádiz CF players
Magreb '90 players
VVOG players
Derde Divisie players
Moroccan expatriate footballers
Moroccan expatriate sportspeople in Denmark
Expatriate men's footballers in Denmark
Moroccan expatriate sportspeople in Spain
Expatriate footballers in Spain
Moroccan expatriate sportspeople in France
Expatriate footballers in France
Moroccan expatriate sportspeople in the Netherlands
Expatriate footballers in the Netherlands